French Ivorians are those who were born in or reside in Ivory Coast, who descend from French community. There was a small but prominent French community in Ivory Coast until 2002, when a failed coup d'état and civil war led to anti-French riots. Of the 20,000 living in the country at the start of the conflict, by 2004 only 15,000 remained.

Population graph

Notable people 
Dominique Ouattara (born 1954), current First Lady of Ivory Coast (2011-present)

References 

History of Ivory Coast
Ethnic groups in Ivory Coast
Ivorian people of European descent
Ivory Coast